Admiral Sir Charles Holcombe Dare KCMG CB MVO (9 November 1854 – 6 August 1924) was an English Royal Navy officer. He commanded several ships and shore establishments before and during World War I, and was knighted by King George V.

Family
Dare was born on 9 November 1854 to Charles William Dare, a lawyer with a practice in London, and Anne Agnes (née Mew, from Newport, Isle of Wight) in North Curry, Somerset, one of four brothers and a sister. Dare's grandfather, also Charles Holcombe Dare, was a Land Tax Commissioner for North Curry. The family had connections in London and the Isle of Wight. Dare married Emily Agnes Harper, a railway guard's daughter who, unusually for the time, brought an illegitimate daughter, Maud, to the marriage.

Naval career

Early career
Dare enlisted in the Royal Navy as an officer cadet, first serving as a midshipman on HMS Monarch, and was commissioned in 1868. He was a sub-lieutenant until 1879, when he was promoted to lieutenant. In 1893, he was promoted to commander.

Command

On his promotion to commander, Dare was given command of HMS Lapwing, a Redbreast-class gunboat, one of the last built of composite materials. In 1898, he was in command of HMS Archer, serving for a time in the Far East. In 1900, he was promoted to full captain, temporary on promotion, in command of the third class cruiser, HMS Bellona.

In 1903, he was given command of HMS Assistance to carry out sea trials off Sheerness; the first of her type, she was a "floating dockyard" designed to go to sea with the fleet, and cost £213,000. In December 1903 he was put in command of the new armoured cruiser HMS Berwick, seeing service with the 2nd Cruiser Squadron; in March 1904 she returned to Chatham from the West Indies for a refit. In September the same year Dare was appointed to the Royal Victorian Order. In 1906, he was in command of HMS Ramillies for six months, following which, in September, he was put in command of the Eastern Coastguard District until April 1909.

In 1908 Dare was awarded a Good Service Pension of £150 per annum.

Flag
In March 1909, Dare was promoted to Rear Admiral on the retirement of Rear Admiral Fegan, conforming to the Navy's regulations on the permitted number of serving senior officers. Four months later, he placed himself on the retired list. At this time he was living near Ipswich and a vice-president of Erwarton Quoit Club, and made a speech on the occasion of the rector of Harkstead's 70th birthday.

World War I

A few months after the outbreak of the war, Dare was made a captain in the Royal Naval Reserve and in 1915 took command of HMS Idaho, the shore establishment at Milford Haven, to counter the threat from German U-boats to shipping, including convoys, in the area. At the end of the war, Dare paid tribute to all who had served at the Milford base.

Post-war
Dare was knighted by King George V in May 1919, the citation reading: For valuable services in command of the important Auxiliary Patrol Base of Milford Haven since February 1915.

Death
Admiral Dare died on 6 August 1924 in Shotley, near Ipswich, aged 69; his death was reported in The Times. His wife survived him and his estate was valued at £2,593. His daughter, Maud G. Dare, left a 1915 family photograph album to The National Maritime Museum.

References

External links
The Dreadnought Project

1854 births
1924 deaths
Royal Navy admirals of World War I
Members of the Royal Victorian Order
Companions of the Order of the Bath
Knights Grand Cross of the Order of St Michael and St George
Royal Naval Reserve personnel